Robert Snodgrass (born 7 September 1987) is a Scottish professional footballer who plays as a winger for Heart of Midlothian.

Snodgrass started his senior career with Livingston. He also had a loan spell at Stirling Albion before moving to England in 2008, joining Leeds United. He helped Leeds win promotion to the Championship in 2010. In February 2012, Snodgrass was appointed captain of Leeds, but he rejected a new contract offer and moved to Norwich City later that year. 

He left Norwich after they were relegated in 2014 and moved to Hull City. On his league debut for Hull, Snodgrass suffered a serious knee injury that sidelined him for over a year. Hull were relegated in his absence, but Snodgrass helped them gain promotion via the playoffs in 2016. Snodgrass moved to West Ham United in January 2017, and he was loaned to Aston Villa for most of the 2017–18 season. Snodgrass left West Ham in January 2021 to sign for West Bromwich Albion, and he then had a short stint with Luton Town.

After playing for Scotland at various youth levels including under-21s, Snodgrass received a call up to the Scotland national team side in 2009, and won his first cap in February 2011. Snodgrass retired from international football in October 2019, having made 28 appearances and scored seven goals for Scotland.

Early life
Born in Glasgow, Snodgrass grew up in the city's Gallowgate area; he played boys' club football for a team affiliated with Rangers alongside future international teammate James McArthur who is a month younger and lived a few blocks away. Celtic offered him an apprenticeship, along with Clyde and Livingston. He felt that he had little chance of breaking through at Parkhead, so chose Livingston, joining their setup at the same time as another East End boy who would go on to play for Scotland, Graham Dorrans.

Club career

Livingston
Snodgrass started his career at Livingston, where he scored 15 goals in 79 league games. He caught attention by turning down a trial with Spanish giants Barcelona. Before he turned professional, he was offered a move to Blackburn Rovers, though he chose to stay with Livingston. After recovering from a broken metatarsal, he moved to Stirling Albion on loan for the remainder of the 2006–07 season on 30 January 2007 to step up his recovery from injury.

Snodgrass established himself as a regular first-team member during the 2005–06 season. This was a campaign of mixed fortunes, as he gained regular first-team football, yet his side were relegated to Division 1. During Livingston's first season in the second tier, he scored ten goals for Livingston in the Scottish First Division during the 2007–08 season; he was offered a new contract at Livingston, but turned it down. After failing to impress during a trial spell with Barnsley, he joined League One team Leeds United in July 2008. He left the Lions scoring 15 goals in 79 games.

Leeds United

2008–09 season
After joining Leeds, Snodgrass came into the side for the first game of the season to make his debut against Scunthorpe United, gaining an assist after setting up Enoch Showunmi's headed goal. He scored his first goal for Leeds in the 5–2 League Cup victory over Chester City. After initially struggling to hold a regular place in the starting line-up, Snodgrass established himself after a string of impressive performances throughout November and December, which saw the young winger score four goals in seven games during a poor run of form for the Yorkshire club, culminating in the sacking of manager Gary McAllister.

Leeds reached the playoffs but ultimately were knocked out of the competition after losing 2–1 on aggregate to Millwall. In his first season at Leeds, he scored 11 goals and got 19 assists.

2009–10 season
On the eve of the season, Snodgrass signed a new four-year contract with the club. He scored his first goals of the season with two against Watford in the League Cup second round, sending Leeds through to the third round.

Snodgrass scored a late winner against Milton Keynes Dons in a 1–0 win for Leeds for his first league goal of the season.

In May 2010, he was selected in the League One PFA Team of the Year for the 2009–10 season. Snodgrass played an instrumental part as Leeds were promoted to The Championship after finishing in second place in League One and thus earning automatic promotion. In his second season Snodgrass scored 10 goals in total and gained 14 assists.

2010–11 season

On 27 July 2010, Snodgrass was believed to have suffered a serious knee injury during the pre-season game away to Norwegian team Brann after falling victim to a horrendous challenge by David Nielsen. The knee injury ruled him out of the rest of the pre-season campaign, but after two scans on the injured knee, the injury was not as serious as first feared, but kept Snodgrass out for several weeks. Manager Simon Grayson claimed that no exact timescale had been put on Snodgrass' recovery from injury. Snodgrass returned to training at the start of September 2010. To help gain match fitness after his injury, Snodgrass played 90 minutes in a closed-doors friendly against Middlesbrough. Snodgrass returned to Leeds' squad after injury when he was named on the bench the game against Doncaster Rovers, he came on as a second-half substitute replacing Ross McCormack.

Snodgrass came on as a second-half substitute against Sheffield United and managed to assist Leeds' late winner for Bradley Johnson, however his game ended on a sour note when he was sent off for two yellow cards. Snodgrass returned from suspension for Leeds against Ipswich Town, replacing Luciano Becchio in the starting lineup and scored his first goal of the season. He scored his second goal of the season with a curled effort against Coventry City. His performance against Coventry was welcomed as a return to form by Snodgrass. His third goal of the season came against Leicester City with a long-range effort.

On 1 January 2011, Snodgrass was injured in the 1–1 draw with Middlesbrough, where he was kicked once in the back as well as being stamped on the calf muscle. He scored against Cardiff City with another long range goal. On 8 January 2011, Snodgrass scored with a second half penalty in a 1–1 FA Cup draw with Arsenal. He scored his sixth goal of the season on 1 February, against Hull City. Snodgrass scored against Bristol City on 12 February. Snodgrass missed Leeds' last few games of the season after suffering a back injury.

2011–12 season
In June 2011, it was reported that Leeds had put an £8 million valuation on Snodgrass and that they were looking into offering him a new contract. Snodgrass missed the League Cup match in August 2011 against Bradford City as he had been called up to the Scotland squad. He started for Leeds on the opening day of the season as they lost 3–1 against Southampton. He scored his first goal of the season on 16 August, when he scored a freekick against Hull City. Snodgrass was ruled out of action when he had an emergency operation to have his appendix removed on 31 December 2011. He returned to action for Leeds just two weeks later, scoring in a 1–1 draw against Crystal Palace on 14 January 2012. On 21 January, he scored a goal in a 3–1 win over Ipswich.

Snodgrass was appointed club captain by new Leeds manager Neil Warnock, ahead of his first game in charge against Portsmouth on 25 February. Warnock confirmed he had offered Snodgrass a new contract which would make him Leeds' highest-paid player. Snodgrass finished the season with 13 goals and the second highest amount of assists in The Championship, with 14. Snodgrass won both Leeds' Fans Player of the Year and Players' Player of the Year awards during the club's end of season awards ceremony on 28 April.

Norwich City
Snodgrass signed for Norwich City on a three-year contract in July 2012 for an undisclosed fee. He made his debut in the opening game of the season on 18 August 2012, a 5–0 defeat away to Fulham. Two matches later, on 1 September 2012, Snodgrass scored his first goal for the club when he scored the equaliser which saw Norwich draw 1–1 with Tottenham Hotspur. He scored his second goal on 28 November, scoring a free-kick in a 1–1 draw against Southampton.

Snodgrass would go on to establish himself as a regular in the first team squad. After a successful campaign in which the club finished 11th in the table, he would be voted by Norwich fans as second place in the Player of the Season that season. He narrowly missed out on the trophy, which was won by Sébastien Bassong instead.

Snodgrass scored his first goal of the 2013–14 season with a "free-kick from around 20 yards that looped over the wall and into the bottom-left corner of the net" in a 3–1 win over West Ham United on 9 November. He scored again on 23 February 2014 against Tottenham after a cutting through ball from Bradley Johnson, holding off the defender and placing it past goalkeeper Hugo Lloris from just inside the box. That goal turned out to be the only goal, as Norwich won 1–0.

Hull City
On 30 June 2014, Hull City signed Snodgrass for an undisclosed fee, believed to exceed £6 million, on a three-year contract. Snodgrass dislocated a kneecap during a 1–0 win at Queens Park Rangers in August 2014. The injury, which required surgery to heal, was initially expected to keep Snodgrass out of action for several months. A month later, it was reported that he would be out of action for the entirety of the 2014–15 season. Snodgrass made his first appearance in a game since the injury in November 2015, playing in an under-21 Premier League Cup match. His first return to first-team action was in the League Cup away to Manchester City on 1 December 2015 when he came on as a replacement for Sone Aluko in the 73rd-minute. On 9 January 2016, in the third-round of the FA Cup match against Brighton & Hove Albion, he scored a penalty to take the team through the next round. On 10 December 2016 Snodgrass won a penalty in a crucial home tie against Crystal Palace. Replays showed that he dived and he later apologised.

In January 2017, Hull accepted offers of about £10 million for Snodgrass from West Ham and Burnley.

West Ham United

On 27 January 2017, Snodgrass joined West Ham United on a three-and-a-half-year deal for a fee of £10.2 million. He made his West Ham debut on 1 February 2017, coming on as a 64th-minute substitute for Pedro Obiang, in West Ham's 0–4 home defeat by Manchester City. His first start for the club came away at Saint Mary's Stadium against Southampton, which West Ham won 1–3. In August 2017, having played 15 games for West Ham without scoring, Snodgrass was told that he was free to leave the club either permanently or on loan.

Snodgrass spent most of the 2017–18 season on loan at Aston Villa, after which he returned to West Ham. He scored his first two goals for West Ham in their 8–0 win against Macclesfield Town in the EFL Cup on 26 September 2018. In March 2019, Snodgrass was charged by the Football Association with allegedly abusing anti-doping officials who were visiting West Ham's training ground on 6 February 2019 to conduct out-of-competition testing. The following month, Snodgrass was fined £30,000 and given a one-match ban for the offence. In July 2019, Snodgrass signed a one-year extension to his contract which would keep him at the club until the summer of 2021, with a further 12-month option. However, Snodgrass left the club to join West Bromwich Albion on 8 January  2021.

Aston Villa loan
On 25 August 2017, Snodgrass joined Aston Villa for the remainder of the 2017–18 season. Snodgrass impressed with his early performances for Aston Villa winning praise from manager, Steve Bruce. He scored his first goal for the club in a 4–0 win over Burton Albion on 26 September.

During his loan spell he scored seven goals and got 14 assists, to help Aston Villa secure a play-off place and defeat Middlesbrough in the two semi finals to reach the final, playing in the final, as Villa lost 1–0 to Fulham in the final missing out on promotion to the Premier League. His 14 assists also saw him finish joint top (with Barry Douglas) of the assists charts in the EFL Championship.

West Bromwich Albion
On 8 January 2021, Snodgrass joined West Bromwich Albion on an 18-month contract for an undisclosed fee. He made his West Brom debut on 16 January in a 3–2 win in a Black Country derby at Molineux. He was omitted from the squad for their next game, a 2–1 defeat at West Ham on 19 January. West Brom manager Sam Allardyce said that he had not played due to "an agreement between the clubs". The Premier League stated their intention to investigate the terms of the transfer with regard to a possible violation of their rules regarding one club’s influence over the policies or the performance of another club. Snodgrass had been transferred permanently by West Ham, and it is only loan deals that allow for that kind of restriction. On 31 January 2022 it was announced Snodgrass had left the club by mutual consent, having last started a game in a 3–0 home victory against Bristol City in October.

Luton Town
In February 2022, Snodgrass signed for Luton Town until the end of the 2021–22 season.

Snodgrass left Luton at the end of the 2021–22 season. In August 2022 he was offered a contract by Motherwell.

Heart of Midlothian
Snodgrass signed a one-year contract with Scottish Premiership club Heart of Midlothian on 6 September 2022.

International career

Snodgrass played for the Scotland under-19, under-20 and under-21 teams. He was part of the squad that reached the final of the 2006 European Under-19 Championships in Poland, although Snodgrass was suspended for the final itself. Snodgrass also played for Scotland under-20 in the 2007 FIFA U-20 World Cup in Canada It was his form in this tournament that led to Barcelona showing interest in Snodgrass.

Leeds' involvement in the play-offs against Millwall in 2009 meant that Snodgrass was unavailable to play in a Scotland B international.

Snodgrass was called up to the senior Scotland squad by George Burley for the first time for their friendly against Japan in October 2009. He was forced to withdraw from the squad due to a knee injury. Snodgrass made his full international debut on 9 February 2011, coming on as a substitute against Northern Ireland in a 2011 Nations Cup match. Snodgrass was called up to the Scotland squad to face Brazil on 21 March 2011, coming on as a second-half substitute. Scotland lost the game 2–0. Snodgrass was ruled out of Scotland's Nations Cup matches against Wales and the Republic of Ireland with a back injury.

On 2 August 2011, Snodgrass was called up to the squad for a friendly against Denmark. He made his first start for Scotland against Denmark and also scored his first international goal in this game. On 7 June 2013, during 2014 FIFA World Cup qualifying, he scored the only goal in a 1–0 win against Croatia, inflicting their first competitive defeat at home since they lost 4–1 to England in 2008.

The kneecap injury that Snodgrass suffered in August 2014 caused him to miss the whole of the UEFA Euro 2016 qualifying campaign. He was recalled to the national squad for a friendly match against the Czech Republic in March 2016. In the first match of 2018 FIFA World Cup qualification, Snodgrass scored a hat-trick in a 5–1 win against Malta.

On 16 October 2019, Snodgrass retired from international football with 28 caps and 7 goals.

Personal life
Snodgrass has a daughter, Sienna, with his girlfriend Denise.

On 24 January 2011, an arrest warrant was issued for Snodgrass after he failed to turn up to court regarding an alleged driving offence. A spokesman for Leeds United said that the non-appearance was due to a misunderstanding and that Snodgrass was working with the judicial authorities to resolve the matter.

On 3 March 2017, another arrest warrant was issued for him after he failed to attend his trial for allegedly driving in Glasgow with a baby being held in the arms of a passenger. His defence lawyer said that Snodgrass' absence was due to a misunderstanding.

Career statistics

Club

International

Scotland score listed first, score column indicates score after each Snodgrass goal.''

Honours
Stirling Albion
Scottish Football League First Division play-offs: 2007

Leeds United
Football League One runner-up: 2009–10

Hull City
Football League Championship play-offs: 2016

Individual
PFA Player of the Month (League One): August/September 2009
PFA Team of the Year (League One): 2009–10
LUFC Regional Members Clubs' Player of the Year: 2008–09
Leeds United Supporters' Player of the Year: 2011–12
Leeds United Players' Player of the Year: 2011–12
Norwich City Supporters' Player of the Year: 2013–14
SFWA International Player of the Year: 2013–14, 2016–17

See also
 List of Scotland national football team hat-tricks

References

External links

 Robert Snodgrass profile at the West Ham United F.C. website
 
 

1987 births
Living people
Footballers from Glasgow
Scottish footballers
Scotland youth international footballers
Scotland under-21 international footballers
Scotland international footballers
Association football wingers
Association football forwards
Association football utility players
Livingston F.C. players
Stirling Albion F.C. players
Leeds United F.C. players
Norwich City F.C. players
Hull City A.F.C. players
West Ham United F.C. players
Aston Villa F.C. players
West Bromwich Albion F.C. players
Scottish Premier League players
Scottish Football League players
English Football League players
Premier League players
People educated at St Mungo's Academy
Luton Town F.C. players
Heart of Midlothian F.C. players